Auve is a commune in the Marne department in northeastern France. The source of the river Auve is in the commune.

Population

Notable people 

 Marie Poterlet (1811–1889) wallpaper designer.

See also
Communes of the Marne department

References

Communes of Marne (department)
Marne communes articles needing translation from French Wikipedia